The Dearborn Stars are an American soccer club based in Dearborn, Michigan that play in the Michigan Premier Soccer League, a United States Adult Soccer Association-affiliated (fifth division) league. The club is best known for qualifying for the first round of the 2013 Lamar Hunt U.S. Open Cup.

History

2013 Open Cup run 

Dearborn achieved prominence by qualifying for the 2013 edition of the Lamar Hunt U.S. Open Cup, the oldest active soccer cup competition in the United States. Dearborn qualified for the tournament proper via the 2013 USASA Region II National Cup, which they reached by being the only club to enter the Michigan Open Cup qualifier. In the first round of the tournament proper, Dearborn defeated PDL powerhouse, Michigan Bucks 2–0 off of goals from Nik Djokic. The Stars lost to the Dayton Dutch Lions in the second round proper.

Roster 
As of May 15, 2013.

References

External links 
 Dearborn Stars
 Michigan Premier Soccer League

Association football clubs established in 1982
Soccer clubs in Michigan
Soccer clubs in Detroit
1982 establishments in Michigan